The 1973 UC Riverside Highlanders football team represented the University of California, Riverside as a member of the California Collegiate Athletic Association (CCAA) during the 1973 NCAA Division II football season. Led by Wayne Howard in his second and final season as head coach, UC Riverside compiled an overall record of 8–2 with a mark of record of 3–1 in conference play, placing second in the CCAA. The team outscored by its opponents 317 to 172 for the season. The Highlanders played home games at Highlander Stadium in Riverside, California.

Howard finished his tenure at UC Riverside with an overall record of 17–3, for a .850 winning percentage.

Schedule

Team players in the NFL
The following UC Riverside players were selected in the 1974 NFL Draft.

The following finished their college career in 1973, were not drafted, but played in the NFL.

References

UC Riverside
UC Riverside Highlanders football seasons
UC Riverside Highlanders football